The Iraqi National Intelligence Service (INIS) is an intelligence agency of the Iraqi government that was created in April 2004 on the transitional authority of the Coalition Provisional Authority, following the American invasion of Iraq a year prior.

Background
After the 2003 U.S. invasion of Iraq, the head of the Coalition Provisional Authority L. Paul Bremer disbanded Iraq's military and security services per CPA Order Number 2. As the security situation within Iraq deteriorated and Iraqi resistance to the occupation became stronger and more violent, the need for a secret service became more pressing. In December 2003, The Washington Post reported that Iyad Allawi and Nouri Badran, members of both the Iraq Interim Governing Council and the Iraqi National Accord political party, flew to the U.S. to discuss details of setting up a new secret service with the help of the CIA. The agency was to be headed by Badran and recruit many agents of Saddam Hussein's Iraqi Intelligence Service. The main objective of the new organisation was to counter the insurgency. The hiring process was aided by CIA polygraph

In January 2004, The New York Times reported that the creation of the new agency was under way. It was to employ between 500 and 2,000 staff and be financed by the U.S. government. Ibrahim al-Janabi was said to be the main candidate for leading the spy agency. These efforts drew criticism from Ahmed Chalabi, another formerly exiled Iraqi politician who had good connections with the CIA, who voiced worries that the new agency might be used for the restoration of the old Ba'athist security apparatus and follow the well-established pattern of government repression.

Founding
In April 2004, CPA head L. Paul Bremer signed Authority Order Number 69, which laid out a charter for the INIS and authorized the Iraqi Governing Council to create such an agency. Its first director is Mohammed Abdullah al-Shahwani and it has been funded from secret funds set aside within the Iraq appropriation approved by the U.S. Congress. These secret funds, totalling $3 billion over three years, are said to be destined for covert CIA operations within Iraq (as well as, to a small extent, Afghanistan). Al-Shehwani was in the Iraqi military from 1955 until 1984, fled to the UK in 1990 and lost his three sons in the 1996 failed coup organized by INA and the CIA.

Assassinations 
In mid-2004, 18 INIS agents were killed—ten by the Badr Organization and eight by Abu Musab al-Zarqawi's Al-Qaeda in Iraq according to al-Shahwani. He also accused the Iranian embassy in Baghdad of organizing the Badr assassinations.

In 2021, a number of members of the agency were subjected to assassination, such as: the assassination of the assistant director of monitoring in the intelligence service, Colonel Nibras Abu Ali, and the assassination of an intelligence officer in the Mansour area, west of Baghdad.

According to Iraqi sources, the assassinations come as a "reaction" from the militias towards the restrictions imposed on them by the Al-Kadhimi government in several areas, including changing military and security leaders, removing members affiliated with Iran-backed militas from sensitive areas such as Karrada area near the Green Zone and the airport, and arresting leaders and people affiliated with them such as Hussam Al-Azerjawi, Qassem Musleh and the leader of the assassination squad in Basra during the 2019-21 protests.

Mission
According to CPA Order 69, which established the INIS, it is tasked to collect intelligence and perform intelligence activities with regard to: 
Threats to the national security of Iraq. 
Terrorism and Insurgency.
Proliferation of weapons of mass destruction, narcotics production and trafficking, and serious organized crime.
Espionage and other acts threatening to Iraqi democracy.

References

External links
Official site
Coalition Provisional Authority Order Number 69: Delegation of Authority to Establish the Iraqi National Intelligence Service

Iraqi intelligence agencies